Raheim Sargeant (born 9 June 1992) is a Barbadian international footballer who plays as a midfielder. He is currently playing for Lancaster City.

Club career
In September 2014 he signed a contract with English club Lancaster City.

International career
Sargeant has been capped by Barbados, making his debut in 2010 in a friendly match against Dominica. Between 2010 and 2014, he made ten appearances for the national side, including three appearances in the 2012 Caribbean Cup against Dominica, Dominican Republic and Aruba.

International goals
Scores and results list the Barbados's goal tally first.

References

External links
 

1992 births
Living people
Barbadian footballers
Barbados international footballers
Lancaster City F.C. players
Expatriate footballers in England
Barbadian expatriate footballers
Association football midfielders
Barbados Defence Force SC players
Barbadian expatriate sportspeople in England